The xiphos (plural xiphe) is a double-edged, one-handed Iron Age straight shortsword used by the ancient Greeks. It was a secondary battlefield weapon for the Greek armies after the dory or javelin.

Etymology 

Stone's Glossary has xiphos being a name used by Homer for a sword. The entry in the book says that the sword had a double-edged blade widest at about two-thirds of its length from the point, and ending in a very long point. 

A relation to Arabic saifun ('a sword')  and Egyptian sēfet has been suggested, although this does not explain the presence of a labiovelar in Mycenaean. One suggestion connects Ossetic äxsirf "sickle", which would point to a virtual Indo-European *kwsibhro-.

Construction 
Most xiphe handles followed a two-piece construction (similar to a knife) using either native woods or for more exotic imports like ebony and animal bone. The two slabs were attached to the tang of the sword, secured via two or three pins and then made smooth via filing giving the characteristic oval shape of a xiphos grip. Hand guards usually followed a "bridge" shape and were either also of organic material or iron or a combination of both, also secured via pins on each point. Some swords found in Italy or Macedonia tended to have an iron extension/reinforcement running along the handle (see picture of modern reconstruction of a xiphos made by Manning Imperial above).

There have been finds of xiphe with hilts decorated with gold foil. These swords were most likely ceremonial since they are always found in burial sites.

Surviving xiphe are relatively rare, but appear alongside iron weapons in burial sites, indicating both a household status and continued use into the Iron Age.

History

The period between the Classical and Iron Ages is often referred to as a "dark age", but it featured important developments and innovations in metal casting, alloy construction, and procurement as widespread use of metallurgy slowly spread out of Iberia.

The xiphos sometimes has a midrib, and is diamond or lenticular in cross-section. It was generally hung from a baldric under the left arm. The xiphos was generally used only when the spear was broken, taken by the enemy, or discarded for close combat. Very few xiphe are known to have survived.

The xiphoss leaf-shaped design lent itself to both cutting and thrusting. The origin of the design goes back to the Bronze Age; the blade of the xiphos looks almost identical to the blade of the Mycenean Naue II sword, which itself transitioned from having a blade of bronze into a blade of iron during the Archaic period. It is likely that the xiphos is the natural evolution of the iron version of the Naue II but with a more sophisticated handle design.

The leaf-shaped short swords were not limited to Greece, as mentioned, but can be found throughout Europe in the late Bronze Age under various names.

The early Celtic La Tène short sword, contemporary with the xiphos, had a virtually identical blade design as the xiphos.

Bronze sword myth 

Contrary to popular belief, no example of a xiphos made from bronze has ever been found. The several whole or partial xiphe blades found in places such as Olympia, Macedonia and Southern Italy were all made exclusively from iron. Furthermore Xiphos swords only began to appear centuries after typical Bronze Age weapons - such as the Naue II - had transitioned from bronze to iron. In reality the Bronze Age sword during the Bronze Age was a completely different weapon, and Xiphe were not developed until after the end of the Bronze Age circa 1200 BCE. Researchers think the misidentification of Bronze Age ornaments has created the modern-day myth that the xiphe were ever cast in bronze.

See also
Gladius
Khanda
Iron Age sword
Kopis
Makhaira

External links
Casting

Notes and references
Notes

References

Ancient European swords
Ancient Greek military terminology
Ancient Greek military equipment